East Liberty is an unincorporated community in Monroe Township, Allen County, in the U.S. state of Indiana.

History
East Liberty was laid out in 1848. A post office was established at East Liberty in 1850, and remained in operation until it was discontinued in 1866.

Geography

References

Unincorporated communities in Allen County, Indiana
Unincorporated communities in Indiana